Mahraveh Sharifinia (born April 18, 1981) is an Iranian film and television actress. She has a Diploma in Mathematics (Physics) and has studied music education at the University of Art in Tehran. She is the daughter of Mohammadreza Sharifinia and Azita Hajian. Mehraveh Sharifinia attended a semester studying film directing, but after consulting with her father withdrew from the study in this field. She is trained in the piano as her specialised musical instrument.

Filmography

Film

Television

References

External links 
  
 

1981 births
Living people
Iranian child actresses
People from Tehran
Iranian film actresses
Iranian television actresses